Acrostatheusis is a genus of moths in the family Geometridae.

Species
 Acrostatheusis apicitincta Prout, 1915

References
 Acrostatheusis at Markku Savela's Lepidoptera and some other life forms

Ennominae
Geometridae genera